Aloe macroclada is a plant species in the genus Aloe native to Madagascar.

Description
The species grows slowly, and flowers when it is four to five years old. Flowering time is in the latter half of the dry season, from August to October, in Madagascar. Its large raceme is erect and normally unbranched, and it has many small flowers that are orange or yellow.

The leaves normally curve slightly upward, so can curve sideways when growing on sloped ground. They are arranged in a dense apical rosette and are spreading with a medium to dark green surface which turns reddish under stress. Each leaf's margins are armed with lines of small, reddish to yellow teeth, a feature common in the genus Aloe.

The distinguishing features of this species include: yellow-orange flowers that cover the top  of a typically single flower stalk; racemes that are large, tall and tapering to a point; wide spreading leaves, arranged in a relatively untidy rosette. The oldest leaves lay against the ground and no stalk or trunk is formed. No "pups" or shoots are known to be formed.

References 

macroclada
Flora of Madagascar